2020–21 FIS Alpine Ski Europa Cup was the 50th season of the FIS Alpine Ski Europa Cup.

Standings

Overall

Downhill

Super-G

Giant Slalom

Slalom

Combined

References

External links
 

FIS Alpine Ski Europa Cup